José Calvo Sotelo, 1st Duke of Calvo Sotelo, GE (6 May 1893 – 13 July 1936) was a Spanish jurist and politician, minister of Finance during the dictatorship of Miguel Primo de Rivera and a leading figure during the Second Republic. During this period he became an important part of Renovación Española, a monarchist movement. His assassination in July 1936 by the bodyguard of Socialist party leader Indalecio Prieto was an immediate prelude to the triggering of the military coup plotted since February 1936, the partial failure of which marked the beginning of the Spanish Civil War.

Biography

Early years 
Calvo Sotelo was born on 6 May 1893 in Tui, Galicia  to Pedro Calvo y Camina, a judge, and Elisa Sotelo Lafuente.

He received a degree in Law and moved to the capital, Madrid. In 1913 he joined a maurist circle in the Ateneo where he socialised with other members of the Maurist Youth such as Melchor Fernández Almagro, Pío Zabala, Antonio Ballesteros Beretta, Pío Ballesteros Álava, Quintiliano Saldaña, Manuel Palacios Olmedo, Rogerio Sánchez and Fernando Suárez de Tangil. He became Secretary of the Academy of Moral and Political Sciences of the Ateneo Mercantil de Madrid and a professor at the Universidad Central. He was a member of Antonio Maura's Conservative Party. In his first post he was an administrative officer in the Ministry of Grace and Justice.

In the 1919 election to the Congress of Deputies, despite Maura having in mind the plan of not putting forward a Maurista in the district of Carballino in exchange for a seat in another district, the 25 year-old Calvo Sotelo put himself forward as a candidate. Challenging mainstream conservative candidate Leopoldo García Durán, a follower of Gabino Bugallal (Count of Bugallal), Calvo Sotelo won the seat in the election.

In 1922, he was made Civil Governor of Valencia.

Dictatorship of Primo de Rivera 
Following the 1923 coup d'état by Miguel Primo de Rivera, Calvo Sotelo lent support to the dictatorship. Appointed Director General of Local Administration in 1923, he was the creator of the 1924 Municipal Statute that, inspired by previous projects of Antonio Maura, sought to reform the structure of the State at a local level and was cemented by the free election of mayors and the councillors. He also promulgated a Provincial Statute in 1925. Neither statute got to be enforced. Primo de Rivera then appointed Calvo Sotelo as finance minister of the Civil Directory of the dictatorship in 1925, and he served from December 1925 until January 1930. During his tenure as Minister of Finance, his programme to achieve economic growth featured protectionist, nationalist and interventionist policies.

Second Republic 

After the proclamation of the Second Spanish Republic on 14 April 1931, Calvo Sotelo, because of his prior collaboration with the dictatorship and his fear of being subject to trial, went into exile to Portugal and later France along with other politicians. He was welcomed the day after his arrival in Lisbon by António de Oliveira Salazar, then minister of Finance. Calvo Sotelo spent his time in Portugal studying the Ditadura Nacional regime. After being given a passport by the Portuguese authorities, he lived between February 1932 and May 1934 in Paris, where he became connected with the ideas of Charles Maurras. He also befriended Léon Daudet, Jacques Bainville and Charles Benoist in France. Despite his exile he had been elected as member of the parliament for the district of Orense both in the 1931 and 1933 elections.

After the passing of an amnesty law on 20 April 1934, he returned to Spain with the intention of leaving an imprint on the Alfonsine right, then represented by Renovación Española and led by Antonio Goicoechea. After his return, he had also tried to join the Fascist Falange Española de las JONS, but, albeit endorsed by Ruiz de Alda and Ledesma, his application was vetoed by José Antonio Primo de Rivera, who understood his leadership was being challenged and deemed the Galician politician as "reactionary". By the 9 May Calvo Sotelo was in the Cortes.

He stated that the "Restoration" of the prior liberal monarchy was not intended, but the "instauration" of an anti-liberal one. Sotelo had more personal charisma than Goicoechea and eventually eclipsed him. He became the leading figure of the Bloque Nacional ('National Block'), a newly created electoral project that sought to unite the anti-republican right. The foundational manifesto espoused a return to traditional values, through the means of an authoritarian monarchy and the role of the Armed Forces as counter-revolutionary agent. Neither the leader of the CEDA (José María Gil-Robles) nor the leader of the Falange Española de las JONS (José Antonio Primo de Rivera) endorsed the initiative, which, aside from members of Renovación Española, drew most of its support from the ranks of the traditionalist Carlists. It was also supported by the small group headed by the Doctor Albiñana, leader of the Spanish Nationalist Party.

After the victory of the leftist Popular Front in the February 1936 election, José Calvo Sotelo became the leading speaker of the anti-republican forces in the Parliament, preparing the mood of anti-republican supporters for a coup d'état. Sotelo was aware that there was a planned rebellion within the army and while he would welcome such a development, believing only an authoritarian regime would solve Spain's problems, he was not part of the conspiracy and was not sure when the planned rebellion would happen or if it even would, thus he continued his normal political and personal life.

Assassination 

After the Guardia de Asalto leader José Castillo was killed by falangists at 10pm on 12 July, a group of Guardia de Asalto and other leftist militiamen led by Civil Guard Fernando Condés went to Calvo Sotelo's house in a government's car in the early hours of 13 July on a revenge mission. While they also planned to kidnap Gil-Robles as well, he was not in Madrid at the time. Sotelo was arrested and later shot dead in a police truck. His body was dumped at the entrance of one of the city's cemeteries. According to all later investigations, the perpetrator of the murder was a socialist gunman, Luis Cuenca, who was known as the bodyguard of PSOE leader Indalecio Prieto. Both Condés and Cuenca later died in the first few days of the civil war.

Though the government denounced the murder and promised to investigate, it made no effort at conciliation. Censorship was immediately imposed to conceal the truth, nothing was done to apprehend those directly responsible and instead numerous Falangists and rightists were arrested (this was not unusual behavior when members of the political right were murdered by Popular Front members). A judge, Ursicino Gómez Carbajo, did take up the case independently within hours but the case was abruptly taken off his hands by the Guardia de Asalto , seemingly because he was an independent and honest judge. The first political response was from the Communist Party, who decided the assassination represented a time to forward one of their legislative drafts to other Popular Front groups, which essentially called for the banning of numerous right-wing parties, including CEDA, Renovación Española and Falange, the confiscation of their property and the confiscation of several newspapers. Although its presentation before parliament was impossible due parliament's postponement, its provisions were carried out during the civil war in the Republican zone and the Popular Front government seemed to act in its spirit, announcing the decision to close down the centers of both Renovación Española and the CNT in Madrid, despite neither of these groups having anything to do with the killing.

Sotelo was buried in a public funeral attended by thousands of rightists, many of whom gave the fascist salute, which infuriated the police. Several hundred rightists then marched to the city center in a political demonstration. They were stopped by a police barricade and had to show they were unarmed before they were allowed to pass. As the unarmed protesters approached the center, they were fired upon by the Guardia de Asalto and police units, with a few protesters being killed. Three members of Guardia de Asalto who protested this were temporarily arrested, while some police from Castillo's barracks felt their unit's honor had been stained by the assassination and demanded an investigation. Two Guardia de Asalto units were seemingly on the verge of mutiny. The final session of the Cortes before the war on 15 July was dominated by the assassination. Monarchists and rightists accused the government of creating the atmosphere in which Sotelo's killing was made possible. Gil-Robles presented a list of deaths and disorders of the past month. He said that every day he read calls in leftist newspapers for the right to be subject to "extermination" and warned that "the day will come when the violence you have unleashed will be turned against you."

Brian Crozier explains the significance of the killing:
It is hard perhaps to convey the enormity of this deed, for it is almost impossible to transport it to other countries and different circumstances. Sir Alec Douglas-Home kidnapped and murdered by Special Branch detectives? Senator Robert F. Kennedy kidnapped and murdered by the F.B.I.? Unthinkable, one might say. And that is the point: in Spain in the summer of 1936, the unthinkable had become normal.

Anti-republican conspirators led by General Emilio Mola seized the moment, accelerating the military coup that had been plotted since the February election. According to Antony Beevor, Sotelo's assassination inadvertently caused many more people to support the coup than would otherwise have occurred. In 1960, Franco stated that the revolt would never have developed the strength necessary if not for the assassination. The uprising of part of the Army, starting with the Army of Africa in Melilla on 17 July 1936, under the assumed command of Generals Emilio Mola, Francisco Franco, Gonzalo Queipo de Llano and José Sanjurjo, marked the beginning of the Spanish Civil War.

References

Bibliography

External links
 

1893 births
1936 deaths
People from O Baixo Miño
Conservative Party (Spain) politicians
Renovación Española politicians
Economy and finance ministers of Spain
Members of the Congress of Deputies of the Spanish Restoration
Members of the Congress of Deputies of the Second Spanish Republic
Spanish Roman Catholics
Politicians from Galicia (Spain)
Acción Española
Leaders of political parties in Spain
Assassinated Spanish politicians
People murdered in Spain
Deaths by firearm in Spain
Civil governors of Valencia
Dictatorship of Primo de Rivera